Samuel Howard (1731–1811) was an English surgeon and Fellow of the Royal Society.

Life
Howard qualified as surgeon, with diploma from Surgeons' Hall, after a year of training at St George's Hospital. He was in practice in Covent Garden, and was surgeon to the London Lock Hospital. He became house surgeon to the Middlesex Hospital in 1758. 

Howard was elected a Fellow of the Royal Society in 1771. In 1797 he became surgeon to the Prince of Wales, on the death of Richard Grindall.

Notes

1731 births
1811 deaths
English surgeons
Fellows of the Royal Society